Kenneth Ray Dallafior (born August 26, 1959) is a former American college and professional football offensive tackle who played eight seasons in the National Football League (NFL). Played with the 1984 Michigan Panthers of the USFL.

References
https://www.usflsite.com/84miro.php

1959 births
Living people
American football offensive tackles
Detroit Lions players
Minnesota Golden Gophers football players
San Diego Chargers players
People from Madison Heights, Michigan
Sportspeople from Royal Oak, Michigan
Players of American football from Michigan
Ed Block Courage Award recipients